Robert McKay Gibson (born 10 October 1945) is a Scottish National Party (SNP) politician. He was a Member of the Scottish Parliament (MSP) from 2003 until 2016, first as a Highlands and Islands regional member from 2003 until 2011, then representing the Caithness, Sutherland and Ross constituency from 2011 until 2016.

Early life
Gibson was born in Glasgow on 10 October 1945. He was educated at the University of Dundee, where he headed the SNP student wing, the Federation of Student Nationalists. He was a district councillor in Ross and Cromarty and worked as a senior secondary school teacher in Alness and Invergordon before taking early retirement in 1995.

Political career
Gibson stood as SNP candidate for the Inverness seat in the February 1974 United Kingdom general election. He stood as a candidate for Ross, Cromarty and Skye in 1987 and again in 1992.

Gibson was first elected to the Scottish Parliament in the 2003 election from the Highlands and Islands regional list, and was re-elected for this region in 2007.

During the fourth Scottish Parliament, he was the Convener of the Rural Affairs, Climate Change and Environment Committee.

In 2012, the Scottish Renewables Green Energy Awards named him their Politician of the Year.

In May 2015 he announced that he would not stand for re-election in the 2016 Scottish Parliament election.

Personal life
His partner is the former Highlands and Islands MSP, Eleanor Scott, of the Scottish Greens.

Gibson is also a musician and an author, and has written several books about Highland history and emigration. These include Plaids and Bandanas, The Highland Clearances Trail and Highland Cowboys.

Bibliography
 The Promised Land?, Strollamus Crofers Defence Committee, January 1974 
 Left, Right, Left, Right...?, in Burnett, Ray (ed.), Calgacus 1, Winter 1975, pp. 14–16, 
 Cymraeg – a startling revival, Dafydd Iwan and Arfon Gwilym interviewed by Rob Gibson, in Burnett, Ray (ed.), Calgacus 3, Spring 1976, pp. 18–21, 
 review of The Break-up of Britain by Tom Nairn, in Easton, Norman (ed.), Crann-Tàra No. 1, Winter 1977, pp. 14 & 15
 It's Scotland's Soil, in Easton, Norman (ed.), Crann-Tàra No. 2, Spring 1978, pp. 8 & 9
 A Case for Producer Co-ops?, in Easton, Norman (ed.), Crann-Tàra No. 7, Summer 1979, pp. 3 & 14
 Land to the People, 79 Group News, October 1981, Glasgow
 Community Control: For Scottish Industry, in Dunn, Ian (ed.), Radical Scotland Summer '82, p. 21,  
 Mightier than a Landlord, in Lawson, Alan (ed.), Radical Scotland Feb/Mar 1990, pp. 22 & 23, 
 Toppling the Duke: Outrage on Ben Bhraggie?, Highland Heritage Books, 1996, 
 contribution on Scottish National Party policies to Whose Party Line is it Anyway? General Election 1997, in Grant, Karen (ed.), Reforesting Scotland, Spring 1997,pp. 7–10,    
 The Highland Clearances Trail, Luath Press, 2007, 
 Reclaiming Our Land, Highland Heritage Educational Trust, 2020,

References

External links
 
Official Blog
Rib Gibson MSP Press Room
Highland SNP
Public Whip Voting Record
They Work For You
BBC Democracy Live 
Guardian profile

1945 births
Living people
Politicians from Glasgow
Alumni of the University of Dundee
Scottish National Party MSPs
Scottish schoolteachers
Scottish republicans
Members of the Scottish Parliament 2003–2007
Members of the Scottish Parliament 2007–2011
Members of the Scottish Parliament 2011–2016